Green Lane Cemetery is a small cemetery on Green Lane in Farnham in Surrey, one of four cemeteries owned and maintained by Farnham Town Council.

The Chapel and Cemetery were opened in 1914 and are on a hill which commands views across to the West of Farnham and Farnham Castle. The Chapel could seat up to 80 people but had little use in recent years and was sold by Farnham Town Council for use as a Meeting House for the Plymouth Brethren. The cemetery is divided into six sections allowing for the burial of different denominations; there is a small children's area and an area dedicated to the interment of cremated remains.

The cemetery has 13 military burials, two from World War I and eleven from World War II, the latter including two pilots – P/O Evelyn Creen Stuart Wilson-Steele of 219 Squadron (killed 1942) and Sgt Michael Henry John Kilburn. Kilburn joined the RAFVR aged 18 to train as a pilot and was completing his last two weeks of training when he was killed during a training flight in January 1942. He was initially buried along with the other seven members of his crew at Dyce Old Churchyard near Aberdeen. However, his family in Farnham must have applied to the RAF to have his remains returned to his home town and in 1943 he was reinterred in the plot here. Buried nearby is Lt Ernest Lyford of the Home Guard who was accidentally killed in 1943 aged 55 while training with bombs.

Notable burials

 Eille Norwood (1861–1948) actor known for playing Sherlock Holmes in a series of silent films.
 Sir Robert Pringle (1855–1925) Director-General of the Army Veterinary Corps 1910–1917
 George Sturt (1863–1927), English writer on rural crafts and affairs

References

External links
 

Farnham
Cemeteries in Surrey
Commonwealth War Graves Commission cemeteries in England
Buildings and structures in Farnham
1914 establishments
Open Brethren churches in the United Kingdom